Mark of Esteem (26 March 1993 – 21 May 2014) was an Irish bred thoroughbred racehorse. In his two years of racing, he won four races and placed once from seven runs, with earnings of £365,139.

Background
Mark of Esteem was a bay horse with a white blaze bred at the Dalham Hall Stud by Sheikh Mohammed. He was sired by the Prix du Jockey Club winner Darshaan. His dam Homage was a daughter of the July Cup winner Ajdal.

Racing career

1995: two-year-old season
As a juvenile, Mark of Esteem finished second on his first start before winning a maiden race at Goodwood by three lengths. The horse was subsequently the subject of a disagreement between its trainer, Henry Cecil and its owner, Mohammed bin Rashid Al Maktoum. Cecil wanted to run Mark of Esteem in the Royal Lodge Stakes at Ascot, but Maktoum believed him to be lame and unfit to run. When Cecil took the disagreement public, Maktoum removed all of his 40 horses from Cecil's Warren Place stables. Mark of Esteem was subsequently trained by Saeed bin Suroor for Godolphin.

1996: three-year-old season
His first three-year-old start came in the first Classic of the 1996 season following a winter in Dubai: the 2000 Guineas Stakes at Newmarket.  Mark of Esteem won by a short head in a photo finish from Even Top and Bijou d'Inde.

His next start in the St. James's Palace Stakes was a loss to Bijou d'Inde.

Mark of Esteem then won the Group Two Celebration Mile at Goodwood by three and a half lengths and the Group One Queen Elizabeth II Stakes at Ascot, where he scored by over a length from Classic-winning Henry Cecil filly Bosra Sham. This was the third win of the day for jockey Frankie Dettori at a major meeting when he famously went on to win all seven races. Official handicappers hailed it as the best performance of his generation over a mile for a decade. Mark of Esteem's final start was in America, but he failed to show the same acceleration from mid-division in the Breeders' Cup Mile at Woodbine.

Assessment
Mark of Esteem was retired with a Timeform rating of 137.

Stud career & After retirement from stud duty
Mark of Esteem stood at a stud under the Darley banner where he had much success including his siring of Derby winner Sir Percy and the 1000 Guineas winner Ameerat. His progeny also includes group winners High Accolade, Reverence and Ordnance Row.

In 2007, he retired from stud duty due to declining fertility. on 21 May 2014, he was euthanized following a short illness.

Pedigree

References

1993 racehorse births
2014 racehorse deaths
Racehorses bred in Ireland
Racehorses trained in the United Kingdom
Thoroughbred family 17-b
2000 Guineas winners